The Himontagon Hills are a group of hills located in Loay, Bohol, Philippines, about 20 kilometers from the Tagbilaran City.

References

Landforms of Bohol
Hills of the Philippines